There are between 800 million and 1 billion Protestants worldwide, among approximately 2.5 billion Christians. In 2010, a total of more than 800 million included 300 million in Sub-Saharan Africa, 260 million in the Americas, 140 million in Asia-Pacific region, 100 million in Europe and 2 million in Middle East-North Africa. Protestants account for nearly forty percent of Christians worldwide and more than one tenth of the total human population. Various estimates put the percentage of Protestants in relation to the total number of the world's Christians at 33%, 36%, 36.7%, and 40%, while in relation to the world's population at 11.6% and 13%.

In European countries which were most profoundly influenced by the Reformation, Protestantism still remains the most practiced religion. These include the Nordic countries and United Kingdom. In other historical Protestant strongholds such as Germany, the Netherlands, Switzerland, Latvia, Estonia and Hungary, it remains one of the most popular religions. Although Czech Republic was the site of one of the most significant pre-reformation movements, there are only few Protestant adherents; mainly due to historical reasons like persecution of Protestants by the Catholic Habsburgs, restrictions during the Communist rule, and also the ongoing secularization. Over the last several decades, religious practice has been declining as secularization has increased. According to a 2019 study about religiosity in the European Union (EU) by Eurobarometer, Protestants made up 9% of the EU population. According to Pew Research Center, Protestants constituted nearly one fifth (or 17.8%) of the continent's Christian population in 2010. Clarke and Beyer estimate that Protestants constituted 15% of all Europeans in 2009, while Noll claims that less than 12% of them lived in Europe in 2010.

Changes in worldwide Protestantism over the last century have been significant. Since 1900, Protestantism has spread rapidly in Africa, Asia, Oceania and South America. That caused Protestantism to be called a primarily non-Western religion. Much of the growth has occurred after World War II, when decolonization of Africa and abolition of various restrictions against Protestants in Latin American countries occurred. According to one source, Protestants constituted respectively 2.5% of South Americans, 2% of Africans, and 0.5% of Asians in 1900. In 2000, these percentages had increased to 17%, more than 27%, and 5.5%, respectively. According to Mark A. Noll, 79% of Anglicans lived in the United Kingdom in 1910, while most of the remainder were found in the United States and across the British Commonwealth. By 2010, 59% of Anglicans were found in Africa. China is home to the world's largest Protestant minority.

Protestantism is growing in Africa, Asia, Latin America, and Oceania, while remaining stable or declining in Anglo America and Europe, with some exceptions such as France, where it was legally eradicated after the abolition of the Edict of Nantes by the Edict of Fontainebleau and the following persecution of Huguenots, but now is claimed to be stable in number or even growing slightly. According to some, Russia is another country to see Protestant growth. However, "by 2050 it is expected that less than 9% of Protestants will be European" and "sometime around 2040 half of all Protestants will likely live in Africa."

In 2010, the largest Protestant denominational families were historically Pentecostal denominations (10.8%), Anglican (10.6%), Lutheran (9.7%), Baptist (9%), United and uniting churches (unions of different denominations) (7.2%), Presbyterian or Reformed (7%), Methodist (3.4%), Adventist (2.7%), Congregationalist (0.5%), Brethren (0.5%), The Salvation Army (0.3%) and Moravian (0.1%). Other denominations accounted for 38.2% of Protestants.

The United States is home to approximately 20% of Protestants. According to a 2019 study, Protestant share of U.S. population dropped to 43%, further ending its status as religion of the majority. The decline is attributed mainly to the dropping membership of the Mainline Protestant churches  and even among Evangelical Protestant churches while Black churches are relatively stable or continue to grow.

According to Scientific Elite: Nobel Laureates in the United States, a review of American Nobel prizes winners awarded between 1901 and 1972 by Harriet Zuckerman, 72% of American Nobel Prize laureates came from Protestant backgrounds. Overall, Protestants have won a total of 84.2% of all the American Nobel Prizes in Chemistry, 60% in Medicine, 58.6% in Physics, between 1901 and 1972.

By 2050, Protestantism is projected to rise to slightly more than half of the world's total Christian population. According to other experts such as Hans J. Hillerbrand, Protestants will be as numerous as Catholics.

According to Mark Jürgensmeyer of the University of California, popular Protestantism is the most dynamic religious movement in the contemporary world, alongside the resurgent Islam. According to various scholars and sources popular Protestantism is the fastest growing religion in the world. is one of the fastest growing religious categories in the world.

Methodology 

For the purposes of this list, the following Christian branches are considered Protestant:

 Seventh-day Adventists
 Anabaptists (including Amish, Hutterites, Mennonites)
 Anglicans (including Episcopalians)
 Baptists
 Calvinists (or the Reformed tradition) (including Congregationalists, Presbyterians, Continental Reformed, Waldensians)
 Lutherans
 Methodists
 Pentecostals
 Other Protestants (including Hussites, Brethren, Free Evangelicals, Quakers, United, Holiness and others)

Evangelicals, Charismatics, Neo-charismatics and other revivalists are found virtually across every Protestant branch. Nondenominationals, various independents and Protestants from other denominations, not easily fitting in the traditional classification, are also taken into account.

Estimates of total Protestant population vary considerably. Most reliable sources claim a range of 800 million to more than 1 billion. Difficulties occur as there is no consensus among scholars which denominations should be considered Protestant.

Countries 

The seven regions considered in the following table are the six traditional ones (Europe, Asia, Africa, North America, South America, Oceania), plus Middle East (i.e. countries with Islamic majority from the Mediterranean to Iran).

By region

The following are summary tables of the numbers and percentages of Protestants in each region. Also included are the percentages of Protestants in the world that reside in that region ("% of Protestant total").

Maps

Europe

World

See also
 Christianity by country
 List of Christian denominations by number of members
 List of the largest Protestant denominations
 Catholic Church by country
 Eastern Orthodoxy by country
 Oriental Orthodoxy by country

Other religions
 List of religious populations
 Buddhism by country
 Hinduism by country
 Islam by country
 Irreligion § Demographics
 Jewish population by country
 Bahá'í statistics

Notes

References